Lars Larsson may refer to:
 Lars Larsson (racing driver) (born 1965), double European Rallycross Champion from Sweden
 Lars Larsson (archaeologist) (born 1947), chair of prehistoric archaeology at Lund University in Sweden
 Lars Larsson (footballer) (1962–2015), Swedish footballer
 Lars Larsson (musician), with Arvingarna
 Lars Larsson (athlete) (1911–1993), Swedish athlete
 Lars Larsson (rower) (1911-1991), Swedish Olympic rower
 Lars Gunnar Larsson (born 1940), Swedish nuclear safety expert
 Lars Mejern Larsson (born 1965), Swedish social democratic politician
 Lars Larsson Eldstierna (1626–1701), baron of Ostrogothia, son of Lars Gustafsson Vasa and Brita Törnros
 Lars Larsson i Lotorp, Swedish politician

See also
Lars Larsen (disambiguation)
Lars-Erik Larsson (1908–1986), Swedish composer
Lars Larson (born 1959), American conservative talk radio show host